Mayors of New Bedford, Massachusetts

References

New Bedford